Drama is the tenth studio album by the English progressive rock band Yes, released on 18 August 1980 by Atlantic Records. It is their only album to feature Trevor Horn on lead vocals and the first with Geoff Downes on keyboards. This followed the departures of Jon Anderson and Rick Wakeman after attempts to record a new album in Paris and London had failed. Drama was recorded hurriedly with Horn and Downes, as a tour had already been booked before the change in personnel. The album marked a development in Yes' musical direction, combining the band's progressive signature with Horn and Downes' new wave sensibilities.

Drama was released to a mostly positive critical reception, with most welcoming the band's new sound. It peaked at No. 2 in the UK and No. 18 in the US, though it became their first album since 1971 not to reach gold certification by the RIAA, and their first to miss the top ten there since The Yes Album. "Into the Lens" was released as the album's sole single. Yes toured the album with a 1980 tour of North America and the UK, and were met with some negative reactions from British audiences over the line-up change. The group disbanded at its conclusion; Horn would collaborate with Yes as a producer, while Downes would rejoin the band as a full-time member in 2011. Drama was remastered in 2004 with previously unreleased bonus tracks, and it was performed live in its entirety for the first time in 2016.

Background 
In June 1979, the Yes line-up of Jon Anderson, Chris Squire, Steve Howe, Rick Wakeman, and Alan White completed their 1978–1979 tour in support of Tormato. The five reconvened in November 1979 to start work on a new album. After the various problems they faced while recording Tormato, Yes decided to work in Paris with Roy Thomas Baker to oversee its production. Anderson and Wakeman entered the sessions with enthusiasm and wrote more material together than they had before, but the rest of the band felt the songs were too light and folk-oriented and started writing more aggressive and direct arrangements. The growing internal differences, described by Anderson as a "loss of respect for each other", led to Squire, Howe, White and Baker coming to sessions late, which discouraged Anderson and Wakeman, the latter at times refusing to leave his hotel room to rehearse. Conversely, Howe recalls Wakeman frequently throwing peanuts at White's drum kit during takes of a song he was getting tired of, which in addition to being very noisy and distracting through the other members' headphones took considerable effort to clean up.

Anderson and Wakeman left the studio to drink Calvados in a bar; in Wakeman's words: "Jon and I got really quite depressed and started crying on each other's shoulders and Jon said 'This is not the band that I love, this is not the band that I wanted to keep on going', [and I replied] 'I'm with you, Jon'". The sessions were ultimately called off after White cracked a bone in his right ankle while roller skating with Richard Branson in a nightclub, rendering him unable to perform for about six weeks. Following a break over Christmas, the band reconvened in London for rehearsals in an attempt to salvage the situation. They failed, and Anderson and Wakeman left in March 1980.

Squire, Howe, and White continued to rehearse as a three-piece in Townhouse Studios. At the same time, bassist and singer Trevor Horn and keyboardist Geoff Downes of the new wave band The Buggles were enjoying worldwide success with their 1979 hit single "Video Killed the Radio Star", and had recently secured Brian Lane as their new manager. Since Lane was also responsible for Yes, and with both groups now working from the same office, Lane asked Horn and Downes, both fans of the band, to contribute a song for the trio to record. This led to Horn and Downes meeting Squire at his home in Virginia Water, where Horn played "We Can Fly from Here", originally a Buggles song that was deemed too long for them to record, on the guitar and sang. Squire remarked that his voice was similar to Anderson's and invited both musicians to rehearse with the band. Squire convinced Howe and White to let the pair join the group, feeling they were suitable replacements. Downes thought the music the trio had arranged lacked direction, but Yes liked "We Can Fly from Here" and wished to develop and record it.

Meanwhile, the Buggles were not informed of Anderson's departure and only found out about the situation when Yes encouraged them to take part in recording the song. Horn had doubts in becoming Yes's new singer considering Anderson's reputation among the fans, but agreed as he knew such an opportunity would not arise again. Lane went to the offices of Atlantic Records, the band's label, in New York City to announce the developments. His request for a $200,000 advance for the album was rejected outright by chief financial officer Sheldon Vogel, but Lane secured a deal worth twice as much after the label had accidentally transferred $400,000 to his account some months prior, and used the clerical error in his favour. Atlantic founder Ahmet Ertegun flew to London to assess the situation and see if the new formation was commercially viable. He approved, thus giving the green-light for a new album.

Recording
Drama was recorded in approximately three months at Townhouse with each band member credited for its production and Hugh Padgham, Gary Langan, and Julian Mendelsohn as recording engineers. The sessions began with Eddy Offord, Yes' engineer and producer throughout the 1970s, but several issues resulted in his departure as the album was being made; Downes said Offord "left in strange circumstances. It was a fraught and manic time", but he remained credited as producer of the backing tracks. In 2021, Howe revealed that he fired Offord when three weeks of increasingly erratic behaviour by the engineer culminated with Howe being asked to come down to the studio café immediately, where Offord was frying a pigeon he had apparently caught in the street in a saucepan with the intent of eating it.

Padgham, who had previously worked on a session with the Buggles, accepted Horn's invitation to get involved with the album. He recalled the difficulty in working with Yes during this time as the sessions were "full of dramas" with "so much tension around." The music was put together in several London locations; Howe put down his guitar tracks at RAK and Roundhouse Recording Studios and the rest was recorded at Townhouse and SARM East Studios. Howe recorded his parts in two weeks, saying: "I had total freedom. I went away and recorded 90 percent of the guitars on my own in a London studio and went back and presented it to the band. At first, people said 'Your guitars sound too bright and treble-y.' I said 'No, shut up and use them'". Horn spoke about his efforts to get the album finished: "I got married and two hours later, I was back in the studio. [We decided that] for our honeymoon, we were going to spend two weeks in Miami Beach ... it ended up as three days in Bournemouth and Steve came along, we had a good time actually." Horn and Howe completed the album's mixdown by themselves.

Songs

Side one

According to Horn, "Machine Messiah" was written in one day. Music reporter and critic Chris Welch described Howe's opening guitar riff as "unexpectedly heavy metal". White called the song his "baby", putting together much of its structure and rhythm. Squire found some of its passages difficult to play on his bass and thought it was more suited for keyboards, but was encouraged by White to master his parts. Downes rates the track highly, citing its various sections and mood changes. When he was composing his keyboard parts for the song, Downes included an arpeggiated segment from the fifth movement of Symphony for Organ No. 5 by Charles-Marie Widor, a piece that he was familiar with from his youth. Cover artist Roger Dean said "Machine Messiah" is one of his favourite Yes tracks, while Downes has said it is the central track on the album, epitomising the coming together of his and Horn's style with Howe, Squire and White.

"White Car" was recorded in one afternoon. Downes only played a Fairlight CMI synthesiser on the recording, to test its sampling capabilities: "I tried to simulate an orchestra using these samples, but it was very early days of digital sampling. The bandwidth was very narrow, but that's what gave it all that characteristic 'crunch factor'. We then added the vocoder and Trevor's vocal to the mix". Horn's lyrics were about seeing pop figure Gary Numan driving his Stingray, which was given to him by his record company.

"Does It Really Happen?" originated from the Paris sessions in 1979, with White coming up with its drum pattern. A version featuring Anderson singing a different set of lyrics was recorded and later released as "Everybody's Song" on the 2004 remaster of Tormato. It was then shelved until it was developed further when Horn and Downes joined, making amendments to the arrangement. Horn and Squire wrote new lyrics.

Side two
"Into the Lens" was originally completed by Horn and Downes before they joined the group, but Squire took a liking to it and wished to re-arrange it as a Yes track, which he completed with Downes. Squire later said that the track suffered a little due to the lack of time to complete the album. It features Downes using a vocoder, further highlighting the band's new sound. A version recorded by Horn and Downes only was later released on the Buggles album Adventures in Modern Recording (1981), with the title "I Am a Camera".

"Run Through the Light" features Howe playing a Les Paul guitar, "in the background being very melancholy", with Squire playing a piano and Horn playing bass, something which Horn did not particularly wish to do, but Squire convinced him to perform. "I didn't quite know what to play on it ... one day we spent twelve hours playing and working the final bass part". A different version of the song was recorded with Anderson.  Record World called the single version "grandiose art-rock" and said that "Geoff Downes' elaborate keyboard ornaments and Trevor Horn's dynamic vocal dominate."

"Tempus Fugit" was another song sketched out by the Squire, Howe and White trio in late 1979. Its title is a Latin expression that translates as "time flies". According to Howe, its name was derived from Squire's habit of arriving late to places. He attributed its ascending and descending guitar lines, rapidly changing keys, to the influence of pioneering jazz guitarist Charlie Christian, whose work with Benny Goodman in the late 1930s helped establish the electric guitar as a lead instrument. 

Yes worked on further material during the recording sessions, but remained incomplete. This included "We Can Fly from Here" and "Go Through This", which were performed on the 1980 tour and later released on the live compilation album The Word is Live (2005). "We Can Fly from Here" was expanded into a 20-minute suite on Yes's studio album Fly from Here (2011). A third track, "Crossfire", was later included on In a Word: Yes (1969–) (2002).

Cover
The album's sleeve was designed by Roger Dean, his first design for a Yes album since Relayer in 1974. When Dean was commissioned to work on the project, he knew of the album's title before working on it and adopted "an intuitive approach" to complete it. His previous work was known for its fantasy and mysticism, but this time he made a conscious effort not to do so with things "that you couldn't see in the world today. Maybe they're being shuffled around a bit, but it's not in any degree fantastic". He expressed a particular interest in illustrating a storm adorned sky, with "the light playing across the landscape, so there were some bits that jumped out and very stark and bright, and other bits that are very dark – black on dark grey". Dean summarised that "there was a lot going on" on the final cover, incorporating various elements and "stirred it up ... they came out in a way I guess that training and good luck worked together". In 2013, Dean spoke fondly of his design, ranking it as one of his favourite paintings.

Release
Drama was released on 18 August 1980. It reached No. 2 in the UK and No. 18 in the US, the band's lowest charting studio release in the US since The Yes Album (1971), which peaked at No. 40. "Into the Lens" was released as the album's sole single in 1980. The band shot music videos for "Into the Lens" and "Tempus Fugit"; both of them mimed live performances with minimal visual effects.

The album has been reissued several times; the first was in 1994 by Atlantic Records. In 2004, Rhino Records issued a remastered edition with several previously unreleased tracks, including some from the band's sessions from Paris in late 1979.

Reception

The Guardian reporter Robin Denselow wrote that the album's lyrics are tougher than Anderson's "distinctive ramblings on the mystic fringe", and named "Machine Messiah" and "Into the Lens" as tracks that made Drama a distinctive album. Bill Carlton wrote in The New York Times that with Drama, Yes "didn't take any chances alienating the faithful" fans with a new wave or punk direction and "news more like Yes than Yes". Carlton wrote the album is "full of their tried-and-true brew of orchestral, dramatic, art-rock extrapolations" and is just as "daring and fanciful" as their previous albums. Carlton picked "Tempus Fugit" as his favourite. In the Los Angeles Times, John Mendelssohn wrote that Drama is "infinitely more accessible" than earlier Yes albums, "still highly demanding listening". In the same publication reviewer Steve Pond compared Dean's "kitschy, dramatic land-and-seascape" artwork on the album's sleeve to the music on it.

Pond considered Drama the most traditional Yes album in several years, proving to "anxious fans" about the line-up change that the new group can sound "just like the old model". He described Horn's vocals as at times "uncanny" to Anderson's. A review in The Philadelphia Inquirer gave Drama three stars out of four. With the new line-up, "the results are quite pleasing" with the band displaying greater vitality and strength than their more recent albums, with "generally superb" material. The review picked "Machine Messiah", "Does It Really Happen?" and "Tempus Fugit" as highlight tracks. George Kanzler in Tallahassee Democrat wrote that Yes still retained their "patented group sound" despite Anderson and Wakeman's departure, with high tenor vocals, "rhapsodic" solos, and "brisk" tempo changes. He picked out Howe's guitar work as the band's "invaluable asset" but said the lyrics "are pretentious as always" which focuses mostly on a mixture of light and dark imagery. Rolling Stone picked out "Machine Messiah", "Tempus Fugit", and "Into the Lens" as stand out tracks. It noted the addition of Horn and Downes in the band "has not substantially altered the Yes sound, image or presentation. The high vocals, symphonic arrangements, and quasi-mystical lyrics are still there". It pointed out the "fresh new spirit" of the group's playing, though commented that the Buggles' hit single "Video Killed the Radio Star" is more memorable than the album itself.

Joe Konz, in The Indianapolis Star, wrote Downes is an "adequate" replacement for Wakeman but pointed out that Horn's voice does not work as well in certain sections, such as "Into the Lens". He picked out that track with "Machine Messiah" and "Tempus Fugit" as highlights, the latter containing what Yes "does best" with harmony singing, playing their instruments "rampantly", and making "vigorous rock and roll". On "Machine Messiah", the band "assembles every kind of artillery that it can unload" with its heavy metal opening and duel between guitar and vocoder which Konz compared to "Dueling Banjos" from the film Deliverance. He concluded with Drama being Yes's best in years. In a review written in the Fort Lauderdale News, Cameron Cohick thought Drama "sounds exactly like Yes has always sounded. Frighteningly so". The opening to "Machine Messiah" is compared to Black Sabbath fashion with its "ponderous, droning riff" and keyboard lines from Downes that he compared to Wakeman. He compared the overall mood of Drama to Fragile and Close to the Edge (1972) with "relatively simple" song structures, most with at least one good riff. Though he considered the lyrics are "the usual quasi-cosmic tripe", Cohick picked "Run Through the Light" as the album's best track which he compared to "The Battle of Evermore" by Led Zeppelin.

Music critic Rick Johnson thought the group came up with a consistent album, summarising it as "fairly solid stuff". In a retrospective review for AllMusic, Paul Collins rates the album three stars out of five, writing: "It rocks harder than other Yes albums" and a "harbinger of Yes and Asia albums to come" throughout the 1980s. He points out Squire's "emboldened" and "aggressive" bass playing with White's drums, and Howe's "more metallic" approach. Collins picks out "Machine Messiah" and "Tempus Fugit" as the album's best tracks within an album of promising material.

Former (and later) Yes singer Jon Anderson felt the album was "not my idea of Yes" and did not represent what the band "truly is", but was open to rehearsing songs from the record during his later tenures in the group, though his suggestions were declined.

In 2014, Prog readers voted Drama the 100th best progressive rock album.

Seven years later, in his memoirs, Howe recalled that "Drama stands out in my estimation as a true classic Yes album. It speaks oceans about Yes music and the melodic adventures that we loved, a kind of accumulation of the previous decade, I'd say."

Live performance

Yes toured Drama with a concert tour of North America and the UK from August to December 1980. Horn and Downes had never performed live on such a large scale before, and learned the Yes repertoire with Downes playing 14 keyboards on stage. Horn faced issues with nervousness and with his voice, which increasingly strained as the tour progressed due to his efforts to match Anderson's high register. While marketing for the tour was mute on the lineup change, much of the North American leg was still a success; the tour included three sold out shows at Madison Square Garden in New York City, where the band were presented a commemorative award for selling out the venue 16 consecutive times since 1974. The UK leg, however, was not as well-received: many audience members expressed their anger with the lineup change by booing and jeering Horn and Downes.

After the tour, Yes disbanded in early 1981. Horn began a career in producing, while Howe and Downes formed Asia. All five members of the Drama line-up reunited in the recording of Yes's twentieth album, Fly from Here (2011). An alternate version of that album, Fly from Here – Return Trip (2018), features Horn on lead vocals.

Yes did not revisit songs from Drama until Anderson's departure from the band in 2008. For their 2016 European tour, the album was performed in its entirety for the first time, in track order. Horn sang "Tempus Fugit" with the band on stage on their Oxford and London dates.

Track listing
All songs by Geoff Downes, Trevor Horn, Steve Howe, Chris Squire and Alan White, except where noted.

2004 CD reissue

Personnel
Credits are adapted from the 1980 and 1994 issues of the album.

Yes
Trevor Horn – lead vocals, fretless bass on Run Through the Light
Steve Howe – Gibson Les Paul guitar on Machine Messiah and Run Through the Light, Gibson Les Paul Gold Top on Does It Really Happen?, Fender Console Pedal steel guitar and Fender Telecaster guitar on Into the Lens, Martin mandolin on Run Through the Light, Fender Stratocaster on Tempus Fugit, backing vocals
Chris Squire – bass except on Run Through the Light, piano on Run Through the Light, backing vocals
Geoff Downes – keyboards, Fairlight CMI, vocoder on Into the Lens
Alan White – drums, percussion, backing vocals

Production
Sandy Campbell, Jim Halley, Phil Straight – co-ordination
George Chambers – tape operator
David Clarke – inside cover photography
Sean Davis (Strawberry Studios) – mastering engineer
Roger Dean – cover painting
Magnetic Storm – cover design
Joe Gastwirt (Ocean View Digital) – remastering engineer (1994 issue)
Brian Lane – management
Eddie Offord – producer (backing tracks)
Hugh Padgham (Townhouse), Gary Langan and Julian Mendelsohn (SARM East), Ashley Howe (Roundhouse), Pete Schwier (RAK) – recording engineers

Chart performance

Certifications

Notes

References
Footnotes

References

Bibliography

 

Yes (band) albums
Albums with cover art by Roger Dean (artist)
1980 albums
Atlantic Records albums
Albums produced by Eddy Offord